Monal is a locality in the North Burnett Region, Queensland, Australia.

History 
The locality takes its name from the parish name, which in turn takes its name from the pastoral run held by James C. Mackay in 1853. The run can be seen on 1872 and 1878 maps of the district.

Monal Provisional School opened on 15 June 1892. On 1 January 1909 it became Monal State School. It closed in 1909, but reopened in 1912 but then closed again. In 1915 it reopened as a half time school with Dooboon State School (meaning the two schools shared a single teacher) but closed again circa 1916. In 1925 the school reopened as Monal Creek Provisional School, became Monal Creek State School in 1927, thenBukali State School in June 1936. The school finally closed in 1963.

Heritage listings 
Monal has a number of heritage-listed sites, including:

 Monal Road: Monal Town Site, Mine and Cemetery

References 

North Burnett Region
Localities in Queensland